Sinan Çalışkanoğlu (born January 26, 1978) is a Turkish actor. He is best known for fantasy child series "Selena" and sketches theatre "Güldür Güldür Show". He played in many hit series "İşler Güçler", "En Son Babalar Duyar", "Hayat Bilgisi", "Türk Malı", "Bir İstanbul Masalı", "Yahşi Cazibe".  He was a host of the variety show Elin Oğlu.

Filmography

References

External links

1978 births
Living people
Turkish male television actors
Turkish male film actors
Turkish male stage actors